NGC 991 is an intermediate spiral galaxy the constellation Cetus. This galaxy was discovered by astronomer William Herschel in 1785.

A type Ib supernova designated SN 1984l was discovered in this galaxy in late August 1984 by R. Evans.

References

External links
 

Intermediate spiral galaxies
Cetus (constellation)
0991
009846